Texas State Highway 155 (SH 155) is a highway in the U.S. state of Texas. It runs from Palestine to Linden as a mostly divided highway by way of Tyler.

From Palestine to Linden, SH 155 is part of the Blue Star Memorial Highway.

Route description

SH 155 begins at US 79 / SH 19 in Palestine northeastward via Frankston to SH 64 at Tyler. Just north of Frankston, a series of three causeways, one measuring a mile in length, crosses Lake Palestine and passes through the resort towns of Coffee City and Dogwood City. Located on the county line, Coffee City is home to a number of liquor stores to serve Tyler residents, due to the fact that Tyler was situated in a dry county until 2012. The route is concurrent with US 271 on two separate sections in the city of Tyler and the town of Gilmer.

Nearly the entire route consists of a divided highway posted at 70 mph.  For many years, one of the sole remaining two-lane segments and a source of congestion was a  stretch extending from Frankston to Pert.  Construction to build a parallel southbound lane commenced in early 2007 and was completed in 2011, upgrading this stretch of Highway 155 to a full 4-lane divided highway.

History
SH 155 was originally designated on March 19, 1930 on a route from Gilmer to Marshall. On December 22, 1936, it extended southwest to Tyler. On September 26, 1939, the section from Marshall to Gilmer was transferred to SH 154 when it was extended east from Quitman. The route was extended south to Palestine and north to Linden on May 18, 1944. On August 28, 1958, SH 155 was signed, but not designated, along Spur 226. On August 29, 1990, Spur 226 was cancelled and transferred to SH 155 officially. Spur 226 was reused for a route in Terrell on July 11, 2017.

Major intersections

See also

 List of state highways in Texas
 List of highways numbered 155

References

External links

155
Monuments and memorials in Texas
Transportation in Anderson County, Texas
Transportation in Henderson County, Texas
Transportation in Smith County, Texas
Transportation in Upshur County, Texas
Transportation in Marion County, Texas
Transportation in Cass County, Texas